The caveman is a stock character representative of primitive humans in the Paleolithic. The popularization of the type dates to the early 20th century, when Neanderthals were influentially described as "simian" or "ape-like" by Marcellin Boule and Arthur Keith.

The term "caveman" has its taxonomic equivalent in the now-obsolete binomial classification of Homo troglodytes (Linnaeus, 1758).

Characteristics

Cavemen are typically portrayed as wearing shaggy animal hides, and capable of cave painting like behaviorally modern humans of the last glacial period. They are often shown armed with rocks, cattle bone clubs, spears, or sticks with rocks tied to them, and are portrayed as unintelligent, easily frightened, and aggressive. Popular culture also frequently represents cavemen as living with, or alongside, dinosaurs, even though non-avian dinosaurs became extinct at the end of the Cretaceous period, 66 million years before the emergence of the Homo sapiens species. The era that most people think of when they talk about "cavemen" is the Paleolithic Era, sometimes referred to as the Stone Age (though actually the Paleolithic is but one part of the Stone Age). This era extends from more than 2 million years into the past until sometime between 40,000 and 10,000 years ago.

The image of these people living in caves arises from the fact that caves are where the preponderance of artifacts have been found from European Stone Age cultures. However, this most likely reflects the degree of preservation that caves provide over the millennia, rather than an indication of them being a typical form of shelter. Until the last glacial period, the great majority of humans did not live in caves, as nomadic hunter-gatherer tribes that lived in a variety of temporary structures, such as tents and wooden huts (e.g., at Ohalo). A few genuine cave dwellings did exist, however, such as at Mount Carmel in Israel.

Stereotypical cavemen have traditionally been depicted wearing smock-like garments made from the skin of other animals and held up by a shoulder strap on one side. They are also depicted carrying large clubs approximately conical in shape. They often have grunt-like names, such as Ugg and Zog.

History

Caveman-like heraldic "wild men" were found in European and African iconography for hundreds of years. During the Middle Ages, these beings were generally depicted in art and literature as bearded and covered in hair, and often wielding clubs and dwelling in caves. While wild men were always depicted as living outside of civilization, there was an ongoing debate as to whether they were human or non-human.

In Sir Arthur Conan Doyle's The Lost World (1912), ape-men are depicted in a fight with modern humans. How the First Letter Was Written and How the Alphabet was Made is one of Rudyard Kipling's Just So Stories (1902) featuring a group of cave-people. Edgar Rice Burroughs adapted this idea for The Land That Time Forgot (1918). A genre of cavemen films emerged, typified by D. W. Griffith's Man's Genesis (1912); they inspired Charles Chaplin's satiric take, in His Prehistoric Past (1914) as well as Brute Force (1914), The Cave Man (1912), and later Cave Man (1934). From the descriptions, Griffith's characters cannot talk, and use sticks and stones for weapons, while the hero of Cave Man is a Tarzanesque figure who fights dinosaurs. Captain Caveman and the Teen Angels, which aired from 1977 to 1980, is a classic animated comedy depicting cavemen as totally hairy with a club.

D. W. Griffith's Brute Force, a silent film released in 1914, represents one of the earliest portrayals of cavemen and dinosaurs together, with its depiction of a Ceratosaurus. The film reinforced the incorrect notion that non-avian dinosaurs co-existed with prehistoric humans.

The anachronistic combination of cavemen with dinosaurs eventually became a cliché, and has often been intentionally invoked for comedic effect. The comic strips B.C., Alley Oop, the Spanish comic franchise Mortadelo y Filemón, and occasionally The Far Side and Gogs portray "cavemen" with dinosaurs. Gary Larson, in his 1989 book The Prehistory of the Far Side, stated he once felt that he needed to confess his cartooning sins in this regard: "O Father, I Have Portrayed Primitive Man and Dinosaurs In The Same Cartoon". The animated series The Flintstones, a spoof on family sitcoms, portrays the Flintstones even using dinosaurs, pterosaurs and prehistoric mammals as tools, household appliances, vehicles, and construction machines.

See also
 Cave dweller
 Cavewoman, a 1993-2009 American comic book series
 Cavegirl, a 2002-03 British TV series
 Walking with Cavemen, 2003 documentary miniseries
 Dawn of Humanity, 2015 PBS film
 Man cave
 Neanderthals in popular culture
 Prehistoric fiction
 Troglodyte (disambiguation)

References

External links
 Apes as Human at The Encyclopedia of Science Fiction
 Cavemen at Comic Vine
 Origin of Man at The Encyclopedia of Science Fiction

Adventure fiction
Fantasy tropes
Prehistoric people in popular culture
Stock characters